The Great Mosque of Surakarta (Indonesian Masjid Agung Surakarta, Javanese Masjid Ageng Karaton Surakarta Hadiningrat) is an 18th-century Javanese mosque in Surakarta, Central Java, Indonesia. It is the royal mosque of the Surakarta Sunanate.

History

The Great Mosque of Surakarta was built by Sunan Pakubuwono III in 1763. The mosque was completed in 1768. The mosque was both a jami mosque (mosque for Friday prayer) and royal mosque (mosque for ceremonies or rituals related with the royal). Traditionally, the mosque also served as a judiciary in matters of religious significance.

The fence was added for the mosque complex in 1858 during the reign of Sunan Pakubuwono VIII. A Mughal architecture-inspired minaret was built in 1928 during the reign of Sunan Pakubuwono XI.

The mosque 

Surakarta Great Mosque is located within a 19,180 sqm complex surrounded by a solid wall. The design of the Great Mosque of Surakarta follows a conservative Javanese architecture principle. It basically consists of two buildings: the main prayer hall and the front hall. Four main posts (Javanese ) supported the roof of the main prayer hall. This roof is a pyramidal tajug-styled roof, a type of roof traditionally reserved for sacred buildings in Javanese architectural principle. A  is a place for the ruler of the kraton to perform prayer. In case of the Great Mosque of Surakarta, the  has a small hip roof.

The  is basically a porch-like structure semi-attached to the front facade of the main prayer hall. The serambi kept two  (Javanese drum to call prayer) and a large wooden . The  is used as women's praying room.

The minaret was located to the northeast of the mosque. The design is based on Qutb Minar of Delhi.

The vicinity
Following the traditional Javanese city planning, the mosque is located facing the northern alun-alun of the kraton of the Kasunanan of Surakarta. To the south of the mosque is the Pasar Klewer ("Klewer Market"). The traditional  of Kauman, known for its  craftsmanship, is located north of the Great Mosque.

See also
List of mosques in Indonesia

References

Works cited

Mosques in Surakarta
Religious buildings and structures completed in 1768
18th-century mosques
Surakarta
1768 establishments in Asia